Debden is a small rural village in the Uttlesford district of Essex in the East of England. It is located 4 miles (6 km) from Saffron Walden and 17 miles (27 km) from Cambridge.

RAF Debden is nearby and played a role in the Second World War.

Since 2007 the village has shared twin status with the village of Tang Ting in rural Nepal.

History
The village was recorded in the Domesday Book of 1086 as Depeduna (deep valley), and became known as Debden at the time of the Napoleonic Wars.

After the Norman conquest the manor of Debden was granted to Ralph Peverel, but reverted to the crown after Peverel's grandson, William Peverel the Younger, poisoned the Earl of Chester. King John later granted the manor to Geoffrey Fitzpeter, 1st Earl of Essex and it descended in that family until becoming Crown land again. Henry VIII granted it to Lord Audley, from whom it descended to his grandson, Thomas Howard, Baron Howard de Walden and Earl of Suffolk. It was acquired in 1715 by wealthy merchant Richard Chiswell, MP and remained in the Chiswell family for some 100 years. It then passed by marriage to the Vincent family who held it until 1882 when Mrs Cely-Trevilian, the last member of the family, sold it to William Fuller-Maitland of Stansted Mountfitchet Hall. By the First World War it had come into the possession of Lord Strathcona and Mount Royal. Later owners found Debden Hall too expensive to maintain, and so the house was demolished and part of the estate sold off in 1935.

Notable people 
 Henry Vane the Younger (1613–1662), an English politician, statesman, and colonial governor.

See also
The Hundred Parishes

References

External links

 Debden Village Homepage
 Tang Ting Twinning Association Homepage

Villages in Essex
Uttlesford